The Voice Project may refer to:
 Voice Project (non-profit), a non-profit advocacy group focused on promoting freedom of artistic expression as an agent of social change.
 The Voice Project (music),  an open-access singing project, based in Norwich, England.